Wonderland City was an amusement park located at Tamarama, on Wonderland Avenue near the point at which it joins Fletcher Street, in Sydney, Australia. It opened on Saturday, 1 December 1906 and closed in 1911. At the time it was the largest open air amusement park in the southern hemisphere. The  amusement park was operated by theatrical entrepreneur William Anderson. A large wooden bridge build over an artificial lake, the Alpine Slide would take you to "Rivers of the World", Seal Pond. An open air Roller Skating Ring, American Shooting Gallery. It was operated by electric light powered by its own steam plant, and the whole area was covered with thousands of gaily coloured lamps and described as a Fairy City. The first Surf "Gymkhana" Carnivals was held at Wonderland City (Tamarama Beach) organised by Bondi SBLSC on Saturday 11 February 1908.    was dogged by controversy for its attempts using high barbed-wire fence blocked access completely to local swimmers from Tamarama Beach. Before being occupied by the amusement park, Tamarama Park was the site of The Royal Aquarium and Pleasure Grounds, commonly called the Bondi Aquarium.

External links 

 Photos of Wonderland City from Waverley Library Image Gallery

Further reading 

 Wonderland City and Tamarama. Atkins. State Library of New South Wales

References                                                                                                                                                                        

Defunct amusement parks in Australia
1906 establishments in Australia
1911 disestablishments in Australia
Amusement parks in New South Wales